Driven is an unreleased Pakistani action crime-thriller film directed and written by Michael Hudson. The film stars Kamran Faiq, Amna Ilyas, Javed Sheikh, Adnan Shah, Rehan Sheikh, Omair Rana, and Najia Baig.

Cast 
 Javed Sheikh as Danial Khan
 Adnan Shah Tipu as Ifran Khan
 Rehan Sheikh as Inspector Murtaza Shah
 Amna Ilyas as Sobia Kazim
 Omair Rana as Assistant-Sub Inspector Bukhari
Kamran Faiq as Ahsan Malik

Production 
The film was mostly written in English language for the "educated audience," while Urdu had also been used at some parts. British director Michael Hudson developed the script based on the real-life events of actor Kamran Faiq, who would also appear and produce the film. The script was very difficult to write because Hudson had never been to Pakistan before, so he got Faiq's help in writing the script. The other cast included Javed Sheikh, Amna Ilyas, Adnan Shah Tipu, Rehan Sheikh, and Omair Rana. The film would be a co-production of Pakistan, Poland, UK and Russia.

Filming 
Principal photography on the film was done in Lahore, Pakistan, the location was chosen by the director who thought the script was a perfect fit in the country. In May 2015, filming was underway.

Release

References

External links
 

Unreleased Pakistani films
Pakistani action thriller films
Pakistani crime action films
Films shot in Lahore
Films set in Lahore